Col de la Croix ("Pass of the Cross") is the name of the following passes:

Col de la Croix (Vaud), an Alpine pass in the canton of Vaud, Switzerland
Col de la Croix (Jura), a pass of the Jura range in the canton of Jura, Switzerland
Col de la Croix (Cottian Alps) (or "Passo della Croce"), an Alpine pass in the Cottian Alps
Col de la Croix (Corsica) (or "Bocca a Croce"), a pass in the department of Corse-du-Sud, France

See also
, a pass of the Vosges mountains; see List of mountain passes and hills in the Tour de France
Col de la Croix du Bonhomme, an Alpine pass in France; see Ultra-Trail du Mont-Blanc
Col de la Croix de Chaubouret, a pass in the Pilat massif
Col de la Croix de Fer, an Alpine pass in France
Col de la Croix Fry, an Alpine pass in France
Col de la Croix Haute, an Alpine pass in France
, Hainaut Province, Belgium
; see List of mountain passes and hills in the Tour de France
Col de la Croix-Morand, a mountain pass of the Massif Central of southern France
Col de la Croix de Mounis, a mountain pass in the Parc naturel régional du Haut-Languedoc of southern France
, a mountain pass in the Massif Central of southern France; see List of mountain passes and hills in the Tour de France
, a pass of the Jura range in Ain, France; see List of mountain passes and hills in the Tour de France
, a mountain pass in Puy-de-Dôme, France; see List of mountain passes and hills in the Tour de France